The 2012 BSWW Mundialito was a beach soccer tournament that took place at Praia da Rocha, Portimão, Portugal from July 27 to 29. This competition was played in a round-robin format.

Participating nations

Final standings

Schedule and results

Winners

Awards

Top scorers

7 goals
 Madjer
5 goals
 R. Amarelle
4 goals
 D. Pajón
3 goals
 B. Novo
 Juanma
 Antonio
 Weirauch
2 goals
 Marinho
 L. Vaz
 Sidi
 Llorenç

1 goal
 J. Santos
 P. Graça
 Lucio
 M. Beiro
 O. Romrig
 S. Ullrich
 D. Caste
 C. Thürk
 Hao Mh
 Han Xo
 Cai Wm

See also
Beach soccer
BSWW Mundialito
Euro Beach Soccer League

External links
Beach Soccer Worldwide

BSWW Mundialito
2012–13 in Portuguese football
2012 in beach soccer